The United States Senate election of 1928 in New Jersey was held on November 6, 1928. Incumbent Democratic Senator Edward I. Edwards ran for re-election to a second term in office, but was defeated by Hamilton Fish Kean in a landslide. This was the third of four straight elections to this seat in which the incumbents were defeated.

Democratic primary

Candidates
Edward I. Edwards, incumbent Senator since 1923

Results
Senator Edwards was unopposed for the re-nomination.

Republican primary

Candidates
Lillian Feickert, suffragette, former vice-chair of the New Jersey Republican Party, and prohibition activist
Joseph Frelinghuysen, former U.S. Senator (1917–23)
Edward W. Gray, former U.S. Representative from Jersey City (1915–19)
Hamilton Fish Kean, member of the Republican National Committee and candidate for Senate in 1924
Edward C. Stokes, former Governor of New Jersey (1905–08)

Campaign
In June 1924, former Senator Joseph Frelinghuysen declined to run for the U.S. Senate and announced his intention to run in this election instead.

In June 1927, party chair and former Governor Edward C. Stokes entered the race after failing to convince Frelinghuysen and Hamilton Fish Kean to step aside for a compromise candidate. Frelinghuysen derided Stokes for having no particular candidate in mind.

Kean formally announced his entry into the race on January 19, claiming that President Calvin Coolidge had advised him to run.

Lillian Feickert and Edward W. Gray ran peripheral campaigns focused on the issue of prohibition; Feickert supported prohibition and Gray was opposed. Feickert ran as the sole "dry" candidate.

Endorsements

Campaign spending
In February, Frelinghuysen claimed that other candidates were spending too freely and risking an investigation by James Reed's Senate committee on campaign spending, which had begun investigations into the elections of William Scott Vare and Frank L. Smith. (Both would ultimately be expelled.) Most observers took this as an attack on Kean.

Kean, Frelinghuysen, and Stokes were all called to testify before the Reed committee in early June. Both Kean and Frelinghuysen testified that they donated the maximum $50,000 to their campaigns and did not accept outside funding; Kean repudiated charges from the committee that he had issued a "blank check."

Kean claimed $49,366.30 in spending. Frelinghuysen claimed $48,774.97. Stokes testified that he had raised 16,355, of which he contributed $3,000 personally. He claimed to have spent only $14,609.

Results

On election night, the results were too close to call.

Robert Carey, a reformist Jersey City judge who lost the Republican nomination for Governor to Morgan F. Larson, quickly alleged that many Hudson County Democrats had voted in the Republican primary for Larson and Stokes as part of a deal with Democratic boss Frank Hague. Carey demanded an investigation by the state Attorney General, which Kean and Frelinghuysen seconded.

Aftermath
The primary left a lasting rift in the state Republican Party. At the party convention weeks later, Stokes denounced "payroll politicians" and unsuccessfully called for a resolution to bar candidates from spending except on specific items, which he claimed would prevent the nomination from being "purchased." Frelinghuysen also demanded an investigation of Carey's charges against Hague, denouncing "those who pretended to be loyal Republicans but who traded with the Democratic bosses."

Frelinghuysen finally endorsed Kean in September, citing his friendship with Herbert Hoover and his support for the "progressive policies" of the Coolidge administration. He ran for Senate again in 1930 but finished a distant third in the primary to Dwight Morrow.

General election

Candidates
Charlotte L. Bohlin (Socialist)
Edward I. Edwards (Democrat), incumbent Senator
Hamilton Fish Kean (Republican), banker and member of the Republican National Committee 
Will D. Martin (Prohibition)
Frank Sanders (Socialist Labor)
Albert Weisbord (Workers)

Results

See also 
1928 United States Senate elections

References

New Jersey
1928
1928 New Jersey elections